Çullu is a village in the Agdam District of Azerbaijan. The village forms part of the municipality of Quzanlı.

References 

Populated places in Aghdam District